The 1999 GP Ouest-France was the 63rd edition of the GP Ouest-France cycle race and was held on 29 August 1999. The race started and finished in Plouay. The race was won by Christophe Mengin of the Française des Jeux team.

General classification

References

1999
1999 in road cycling
1999 in French sport
August 1999 sports events in Europe